This is a list of airports in Northern Cyprus.



Airports 

Airport names shown in bold indicate the airport has scheduled service on commercial airlines.

See also 
 Transport in Northern Cyprus
 List of airports by ICAO code: L#LC – Cyprus
 Wikipedia:WikiProject Aviation/Airline destination lists: Europe#Northern Cyprus

Northern Cyprus
 
Airports
Northern Cyprus
Northern Cyprus